is a village located in Fukushima Prefecture, Japan. ,  the village had an estimated population of 20,351 in 7618 households  and a population density of 110 persons per km2. The total area of the village was ..

Geography
Nishigō is located in the upper reaches of the Abukuma River valley in south-central Fukushima prefecture, bordered by Tochigi Prefecture to the south.  It is about 185 km north of Tokyo.

Mountains: Sanbonyaridake (1916.9m)
Rivers: Abukuma River
Lakes: Nishigō Dam, Akasaka Dam

Neighboring municipalities
 Fukushima Prefecture
 Shirakawa
 Ten'ei
 Shimogō
Tochigi Prefecture
Nasushiobara
Nasu

Demographics
Per Japanese census data, the population of Nishigō has increased over the past 50 years.

Climate
Nishigō has a humid climate (Köppen climate classification Cfa).

History
The area of present-day Nishigō was part of ancient Mutsu Province. The area was part of the holdings of Shirakawa Domain during the Edo period. After the Meiji Restoration, it was organized as part of Nishishirakawa District in the Nakadōri region of Iwaki Province.  Nishigō Village was formed on April 1, 1889 with the creation of the modern municipalities system.

Economy
Nishigō has a mixed economy of agriculture and light/precision manufacturing, and is also a bedroom community with many people using the Tohoku Shinkansen to Tokyo, which is 90 minutes away.

Education
Nishigō has five public elementary schools and three public middle schools operated by the town government. The town does not have a high school; however, the Fukushima Prefectural Board of Education does operate one special education school.
 Nishigō First Middle School
 Nishigō Second Middle School
 Kawatani Middle School
 Odakura Elementary School
 Kumakura Elementary School
 Yone Elementary School,
 Habuto Elementary School
 Kawatani Elementary School

Transportation

Railway
JR East –  Tōhoku Shinkansen

Highway
  – Shirakawa Interchange

Notable people from Nishigō 
Fumihiro Suzuki, professional baseball player
Toshiyuki Yanuki, professional baseball player

References

External links

 

Villages in Fukushima Prefecture
Nishigo, Fukushima